Edward Dale may refer to:
Edward Dale (burgess) (died c. 1695), Virginia politician
Edward Everett Dale (1879–1972), American historian